Tegan French (born 21 May 1983) is a former Australian rugby union player. She was named in Australia's squad for a two-test series against New Zealand at the 2007 Laurie O'Reilly Cup. In her only test appearance for the Wallaroos, she intercepted a pass and scored a try to help her side lead 7–3 in the 25th minute of the first half.

References 

1983 births
Living people
Australian female rugby union players
Australia women's international rugby union players